The Lafayette Regional Xpressway (LRX) is a planned controlled-access toll road in Lafayette Parish, Louisiana. The LRX has also been termed the Lafayette Loop. It will provide an alternative highway for north-south traffic bypassing the City of Lafayette's urban core. The expressway is being planned by the Lafayette Metropolitan Expressway Commission. The LRX will connect I-49 north of Lafayette near the city of Carencro, Louisiana, I-10 west of Lafayette near the cities of Scott, Louisiana and Duson, Louisiana, and U.S. 90 south of the city of Lafayette near the city of Youngsville, Louisiana. The proposed roadway will initially be four lanes, but will be designed to accommodate future expansion to six lanes. Construction may follow a phased approach with the roadway south of I-10 given first priority.

History
Louisiana Act 893, the "Lafayette Metropolitan Expressway Commission Act," was enacted by the Louisiana State Legislature in 2003. This act created the Lafayette Metropolitan Expressway Commission (LMEC), and grants it the powers to promote, plan, finance, develop, construct, control, regulate, operate, and maintain any limited access tollway or transitway to be constructed within Lafayette Parish. Act 893 gives the LMEC specific authority to pursue nontraditional funding sources, including toll road alternatives. The LMEC may also pursue Public–private partnerships. The LMEC first met in late 2003, and in 2004 the LMEC initiated a transportation improvement project titled the Lafayette Metropolitan Expressway which was later renamed the Lafayette Regional Xpressway (LRX). Planning and public outreach for the bypass was paused beginning around 2011 and resumed in 2016 so as not to compete for the public's attention with the proposed Lafayette Interstate 49 Connector which would be a six-lane interstate routed through the  City of Lafayette.

As with many large transportation projects, development of the LRX  environmental impact statement is utilizing a tiered process to study project impacts. Tier 1 is examining five corridor alternatives. At the end of tier 1, a preferred LRX corridor will be selected and documented in a record of decision (ROD). During the more detailed Tier 2 review, LRX alignments within the preferred corridor will be considered.

The LMEC hosted informal open-house meetings on June 6 and 7, 2017 to involve the public in the LRX project review process. The LMEC reported at that time that it is studying potential corridor alternatives for the Lafayette Regional Xpressway (LRX), which was described as "a proposed loop facility around the Lafayette region to lessen the burden on local arterial roads and streets."

Proposed routing

Several alternative corridors are being considered for the LRX during Tier 1 study.

References

External links

 Lafayette Regional Expressway Home Page

Proposed roads in the United States
Toll roads in Louisiana
Lafayette metropolitan area, Louisiana